Limnae or Limnai was a settlement that existed before the Dorian conquest. It was united with three other such settlements (Mesoa, Pitane, and Cynosura) by a common sacrifice to Artemis, and eventually coalesced into ancient Sparta. Limnae was situated upon the Eurotas, having derived its name from the marshy ground which once existed there; and as the Dromus occupied a great part of the lower level towards the southern extremity, it is probable that Limnae occupied the northern.

Its site is unlocated.

References

Populated places in ancient Laconia
Former populated places in Greece
Lost ancient cities and towns
Sparta